New Amarambalam reserved forest is a reserved forest in the Western Ghats, situated in the Malappuram District of Kerala state of India. It extends till Silent Valley National Park of the Palakkad District to the south and to Nadugani in the Nilgiri District of Tamil Nadu to the North. It is under the Karimpuzha Wildlife Sanctuary .

Geography 
Amarambalam continues with the Silent Valley National Park, and also forms a part of the Nilgiri Biosphere Reserve.

Bird sanctuary 
The Indian Bird Conservation Network (IBCN) has identified 212 species of birds from the Nilambur and Amarambalam forests. Amarambalam is classified as an Important Bird Area (IBS) of the Western Ghats Endemic Bird Area where 16 restricted range species (RRS) have been identified; eight species have been sighted in Amarambalam. Beside the RRS's, there are one critically endangered and two vulnerable species. In 2001 BirdLife International has also identified 52 near threatened species (NTS) of India. Three of the NTS bird species are found in the IBA, but more are likely to be found once detailed studies are conducted. Classified by BirdLife International, Amarambalam Reserve Forest lies in the  Indian Peninsula Tropical Moist Forest (Biome-10): 15 bird species have been identified as typical biome assemblage, 12 species are found in this IBA. In 2003, Professor PO Nameer, Kerala Agricultural University, reported to have seen 11 species of woodpeckers, 11 species of flycatchers, nine species of babblers, seven species of bulbuls, and three species of barbets. As of 2004, there were populations of 10 IBA trigger species ranging from critically endangered/vulnerable to least concern according to IUCN categorisation and A1 to A3 according to IBA, namely Lesser adjutant (Leptoptilos javanicus), White-rumped vulture (Gyps bengalensis), Nilgiri wood-pigeon (Columba elphinstonii), Malabar parakeet (Psittacula columboides), Malabar grey-hornbill (Ocyceros griseus), White-bellied treepie (Dendrocitta leucogastra), Grey-headed bulbul (Pycnonotus priocephalus), Rufous babbler (Turdoides subrufus), White-bellied blue-flycatcher (Cyornis pallipes) and Crimson-backed sunbird (Nectarinia minima). The bird community showed high evenness. Maximum species richness was obtained during November and highest diversity index was recorded during April.

Endemic fauna of the Western Ghats 
As of 2000, Amarambalam comprises almost all mammals found in the Western Ghats: 25 mammals, including the endemic and threatened Lion-tailed macaque (Macaca silenus) and Nilgiri tahr (Hemitragus hylocrius).

Publications 
 BirdLife International: Threatened Birds of Asia. The BirdLife International Red Data Book. BirdLife International, Cambridge, U.K., 2001.
 Sharma, J. K., Ramachandran, K. K., Nair. K. K. N., Mathew, G., Mohandas, K., Jayson, E.A. and Nair, P. V.: Studies on the Biodiversity of New Amarambalam Reserved Forest of Nilgiri Biosphere Reserve. In: Biosphere Reserves in India and their Management. Proceedings of the Review Meeting: Biosphere and their Management, 8–11 September 2000, Peechi, Kerala.
 Nameer, P.O.: Birds of Nilambur Forest Division - a survey report. NEST & Kerala Forest Department, 1993.
 Saneesh, C.S.: New Amarambalam Valley: an IBA of Kerala . MISTNET, 2009.

References

External links 

IUCN Category II
Reserved forests of India
Protected areas of Kerala
Protected areas established in 2003
2003 establishments in Kerala
South Western Ghats montane rain forests
Wildlife sanctuaries of the Western Ghats
Geography of Malappuram district
Important Bird Areas of India
Tourist attractions in Malappuram district